Chanelle Scheepers was the defending champion, but lost to Urszula Radwańska in the quarterfinals.

Hsieh Su-wei won the title, defeating Laura Robson in the final 6–3, 5–7, 6–4. Robson became the first British player to reach the WTA Tour level final since Jo Durie in the 1990 Virginia Slims of Newport.

Seeds

Draw

Finals

Top half

Bottom half

Qualifying

Seeds

Qualifiers

Lucky losers
  Chang Kai-chen

Draw

First qualifier

Second qualifier

Third qualifier

Fourth qualifier

External links
 Main draw
 Qualifying draw

2012 Singles
Guangzhou International Women's Open - Singles